The Berg was a proposed landscaping project by German architect Jakob Tigges to build the world's largest artificial mountain at the location of the present Tempelhof airport in Berlin, Germany. Plans to construct a  mountain that could serve as a recreation area and wildlife refuge were not pursued due to budget and logistic considerations.

References 

Fills (earthworks)
Landscape architecture
Buildings and structures in Tempelhof-Schöneberg